The men's canoe slalom C-2 event at the 2016 Summer Olympics in Rio de Janeiro took place from  8 - 11 August at the Deodoro Olympic Whitewater Stadium.

The gold medal was won by Ladislav Škantár & Peter Škantár of Slovakia.

It was the last appearance of the men's C-2, replaced by the women's C-1 for Tokyo 2020 in order to bring the slalom canoeing programme to gender equality (in 2016 and before, there were 3 men's events to only 1 women's event).

Schedule 
All times are Brasília Time (UTC−3).

C-2 slalom men

References 

Men's slalom C-2
Men's events at the 2016 Summer Olympics